The 2009 ITF Pune Open  (known as the NECC–ITF Women's Tennis Championships for sponsorship reasons) was a professional tennis tournament played on outdoor hard courts. It was the first edition of the tournament which is part of the 2009 ITF Women's Circuit, offering a total of $50,000 in prize money. It took place in Pune, India, on 16–22 November 2009.

Results

Singles 

  Rika Fujiwara def.  Bojana Jovanovski, 5–7, 6–4, 6–3

Doubles 

  Nicole Clerico /  Anastasiya Vasylyeva def.  Nina Bratchikova /  Ksenia Palkina, 4–6, 6–3, [13–11]

External links 
 2009 NECC–ITF Women's Tennis Championships at ITFtennis.com

2009 ITF Women's Circuit
2009 in Indian women's sport
Hard court tennis tournaments
Sports competitions in Pune
2009 in Japanese women's sport
2009 in Indian tennis
Tennis tournaments in India